Chris Bombolas (born 12 May 1960) (often known as Bomber) is a communications and media specialist, and a television and radio presenter. A former sports reporter for 21 years with the Nine Network in Brisbane. A former Australian politician, he served for one term as the Labor member for Chatsworth in the Legislative Assembly of Queensland from 2006 to 2009.

Bombolas was born in Newcastle, New South Wales. Whilst working for the Qld Police Dept he graduated from the Queensland University of Technology with a Bachelor of Business degree in Communications. He became a radio host and worked for 4BC, 4BK and Triple M, before joining the Channel Nine as a sports presenter.

In July 2006, Bombolas believed he could "make a difference in my community", and announced his intention to run for the Labor in the seat of Chatsworth in the 2006 election. Bombolas won the seat against the incumbent member Michael Caltabiano of the Liberal Party.

On 9 July 2007, Bombolas became Parliamentary Secretary for the Minister for Sport and Local Government, Andrew Fraser. Bombolas announced on 19 February 2009 that he would not contest the 2009 state election.

In June 2009, Bombolas became the Chairman of the A-league football club Brisbane Roar. His controversial decision to replace coach Frank Farina with Ange Postecoglou saw the Brisbane Roar win the record for the longest unbeaten run at the top level of any Australian football code, which stands at 36 league matches without defeat.[3] Brisbane Roar are also the first and only club to win back to back A-League Championships.[4]

In 2012, Bombolas was asked to join Hancock Coal/GVK as their External Affairs Advisor (Media & Corporate Communications Advisor).

He now works as a freelance Media and Communications Specialist, plus is a qualified Auctioneer.

References

1960 births
Living people
Australian Labor Party members of the Parliament of Queensland
Australian television presenters
Australian auctioneers
Australian people of Greek descent
People from Brisbane
People from Newcastle, New South Wales
Australian reporters and correspondents
Queensland University of Technology alumni
People educated at Brisbane State High School
21st-century Australian politicians